HMNZS Kahu has been the name of the following ships of the Royal New Zealand Navy:

 , a Fairmile B motor launch, 1943–1965
 , a Moa-class patrol boat used for training purposes, 1988–2009

Royal New Zealand Navy ship names